Jean-Loup Trassard (11 August 1933, Saint-Hilaire-du-Maine) is a French writer and photographer.

He says of himself that he is a "writer of agriculture." Since 1961, he has been publishing short texts, narratives, photographs and texts in which he recounts his "territory" by Gallimard and Le Temps qu'il fait. The vision he offers of the traditional rural civilization which disappears irrevocably, is both ethnological and poetic.

In 2012 he was awarded the grand prix of the Société des gens de lettres Magdeleine-Cluzel for the whole of his work.

Biography 
His father, René, was an entrepreneur ("fermier de droits de place" - "farmer of rights of place"-) on the markets, which was a service to the communes organizing markets, in Brittany and in Normandy. He was a single child who went to the secular school of the village. Catechism, communions and masses were little appreciated.

He lived a country childhood punctuated by agricultural work and which would influence all his work as a writer and photographer. He lost his mother in 1945.

He had poor beginnings in high school (by correspondence then at Lycée Michelet in Vanves). From the 4th to the philosophy class he attended the Lycée of Laval, whose last two years he spent as a boarder. He obtained a degree in law from the Faculté de droit de Paris. Between these legal studies, he followed the courses of ethnology at the Musée de l'Homme and especially, during two years, the courses of prehistory of André Leroi-Gourhan.

Literature 
In 1955, he married. His first child, François, was born in 1957. At the end of 1959, he sent his first texts to Jean Paulhan who received him at the La Nouvelle Revue française (NRF) and led him to Georges Lambrichs, the new literary director at Gallimard.

In July 1960, came the first publication, Le lait de taupes ("Mole milk") at the NRF. In 1960, he became a farmer of communal rights alongside his father, then in his place after his disappearance in 1968. He kept this profession until 31 December 2000. In 1961, a friendship was established with Jean Clay, a journalist and historian of art, who, for a time, was his first reader and an important support. Jean Clay later became the publisher of the Macula publishing house

In 1962, Jean-Loup remarried. He has a daughter, Laure, in 1968.

Literary journey and photography 
Around Georges Lambrichs, he met Dominique Aury and Constance Delaunay, and all the authors of the new series of Georges Lambrichs, Le Chemin : Jacques Borel, Le Clézio, Michel Butor, Georges Perros, Jean Roudaut, Pierre Bourgeade, Ludovic Janvier, Marianne Alphant, Max Loreau and many others, including Henri Thomas, though he was older.

The magazines successively directed by Georges Lambrichs, Les Cahiers du Chemin then the NRF, in which he actively participated, gave rise to various meetings where the authors met. Some of them became and remained very close friends: , Michel Deguy, Gérard Macé. From time to time he published in the magazine Poésie directed by Michel Deguy. In 1980, he met Georges Monti, a publisher installed at Cognac.

The first exhibition of photographs took place in 1983, at La Rochelle Chapelle Fromentin (expo. collective), then Montpellier in 1987 (Médiathèque) and Caen in 1991 (Théâtre). In 1992, sixty photographs are exhibited for three months at Centre Pompidou under the title La campagne de Jean-Loup Trassard. Bernard Lamarche-Vadel, a writer and art critic, introduced him into the world of photography.

He is a breeder: cows Maine-Anjou, calves under the mother, oxen fed in the old way. Since 1953 until today, he divides his time, in varying proportions, between the Mayenne countryside and Paris. He extends his action locally by creating in 1999, the association Mémoire rurale au Pays de l'Ernée whose aim is to trace the evolution of lifestyles in the 20th century on the territory in order to leave a trace for future generations.

Bibliography 
1960: Le lait de taupes, in Nouvelle Revue française, dir. Jean Paulhan
1961: L’Amitié des abeilles : recueil de nouvelles, series directed by Georges Lambrichs, "Jeune Prose",  Gallimard
1965: L’érosion intérieure (short stories), Paris, Gallimard
1969: Paroles de laine (short stories), Gallimard
1975: L’ancolie (short stories), Gallimard
1980: L’érosion intérieure (narrations), Gallimard
1981: Inventaire des outils à main dans une ferme (texts and photos), Cognac, Le Temps qu'il fait
1981: Des cours d’eau peu considérables (narrations), Gallimard
1981: Histoires françaises (in collab. with Patrice Roy), École des loisirs
1981: Trois noëls en forêt (in collab. with Michel Gay), École des loisirs
1982: Une classe de neige, École des loisirs
1983: Bleue bergère (in collab. with Bernard Jeunet), École des loisirs
1984: Une classe de nature ou Comment repiquer les petits citadins en pleine terre, École des loisirs
1984: Rana-la-Menthe (in collab. with John Howe), Ipomée
1985: Abbaye de Clermont : abbaye cistercienne en Mayenne (in collab. with Patrice Roy), Édition Siloé
1985: La Mayenne des chemins creux : 70 circuits de petite randonnée pédestre, Association départementale de la randonnée pédestre (hiking) of Mayenne, ADRPM
1985: L’amitié des abeilles, Cognac, Le Temps qu'il fait
1987: Lance-pierre (short story), Le Temps qu'il fait
1987: Tardifs instantanés (souvenirs), Gallimard
1989: Territoire (texts and photographs), Le Temps qu'il fait
1989: Union soviétique : littérature et perestroïka (in collab. with Charles Dobzynski, Claude Frioux), Europe
1989: Campagnes de Russie (travel), Gallimard
1990: Images de la terre russe (texts and photographs), Le Temps qu'il fait
1990: Ligature (lithography by Daniel Nadaud on five texts), Plancoët, Hôtel Continental
1991: Caloge (narrations), Le Temps qu'il fait
1991: Ouailles (texts and photographs), Le Temps qu'il fait
1993: L'Espace antérieur (souvenirs), Gallimard, Prix France Culture
1993: Archéologie des feux (texts and photographs), Le Temps qu'il fait
1994: Traquet motteux ou L’agronome sifflotant, Le Temps qu'il fait
1995: Objets de grande utilité (texts and photographs), Le Temps qu'il fait
1995: Nous sommes le sang de cette génisse (narration), Gallimard
1996: Tumulus, photographs by Jean-Philippe Reverdot, Le Temps qu'il fait
2000: Les derniers paysans (photographs), le Temps qu'il fait
2000: Dormance (novel), Gallimard
2003: La Composition du jardin (texts and photographs), Le Temps qu'il fait
2004: La Déménagerie (novel), Gallimard
2005: Nuisibles (texts and photographs), Le Temps qu'il fait
2006: Le voyageur à l’échelle (texts and photographs), Le Temps qu'il fait
2007: Conversation avec le taupier, Le Temps qu’il fait
2007: Amère la mer (texts and photographs), Vendôme, Circa 1924
2007 L’Ancolie, Gallimard, Une réédition dans la collection L’Imaginaire de L’Ancolie, sorti en 1975 dans la collection Le Chemin
2008: Sanzaki, Le Temps qu’il fait
2010: Eschyle en Mayenne, Le Temps qu’il fait
2012: L’homme des haies, Gallimard, (prix de l'Académie française Maurice Genevoix 2013).
2012: Causement, Le Temps qu’il fait
2015: Neige sur la forge, Gallimard,
2015: Exodiaire, Le temps qu'il fait

Studies on Jean-Loup Trassard
L’École des Loisirs, 15 November 1984.
 "Territoire de Jean-Loup Trassard", by Yves Leclair, in La Nouvelle Revue Française, n°438-439, éd. Gallimard, July–August 1989.
 "Ouailles de J.-L.Trassard" by Yves Leclair, in La Nouvelle Revue Française, n°471, éd. Gallimard, April 1992
 "Trassard", by Yves Leclair, in La Nouvelle Revue Française, n°503, éd. Gallimard, December 1994. 
 Mythe et réalité dans "Nous sommes le sang de cette génisse" by Jean-Loup Trassard’', mémoire de maîtrise de Julien Guerrier, Angers, 1999
 L’écriture du bocage : sur les chemins de Jean-Loup Trassard’', texts collected and interview by Arlette Bouloumié, Angers, Presses de l’Université, 2000
 Salade ou rôti ?
 "Jean-Loup Trassard", Cahier n° 11 (dir. Dominique Vaugeois), Le Temps qu'il fait, 2014.

External links 

 Jean-Loup Trassard, comme un ruisseau mayennais , a film by Pierre Guicheney
 Le fonds Jean-Loup Trassard de la bibliothèque universitaire d'Angers
 Official website

20th-century French non-fiction writers
21st-century French non-fiction writers
French photographers
20th-century photographers
21st-century photographers
Prix France Culture winners
People from Mayenne
1933 births
Living people